Vladimir Gilelevich Maz'ya (born 31 December 1937) (the family name is sometimes transliterated as Mazya, Maz'ja or Mazja) is a Russian-born Swedish mathematician, hailed as "one of the most distinguished analysts of our time" and as "an outstanding mathematician of worldwide reputation", who strongly influenced the development of mathematical analysis and the theory of partial differential equations.

Maz'ya solved Vladimir Arnol'd's problem for the oblique derivative boundary value problem (1970) and Fritz John's problem on the oscillations of a fluid in the presence of an immersed body (1977).

In recent years, he proved a Wiener's type criterion for higher order elliptic equations, together with Mikhail Shubin solved a problem in the spectral theory of the Schrödinger operator formulated by Israel Gelfand in 1953, found necessary and sufficient conditions for the validity of maximum principles for elliptic and parabolic systems of PDEs and introduced the so–called approximate approximations. He also contributed to the development of the theory of capacities, nonlinear potential theory, the asymptotic and qualitative theory of arbitrary order elliptic equations, the theory of ill-posed problems, the theory of boundary value problems in domains with piecewise smooth boundary.

Biography

Life and academic career
Vladimir Maz'ya was born on 31 December 1937 in a Jewish family. His father died in December 1941 at the World War II front, and all four grandparents died during the siege of Leningrad. His mother, a state accountant, chose to not remarry and dedicated her life to him: they lived on her meager salary in a 9 square meters room in a big communal apartment, shared with other four families. As a secondary school student, he repeatedly won the city's mathematics and physics olympiads and graduated with a gold medal.

In 1955, at the age of 18, Maz'ya entered the Mathematics and Mechanics Department of Leningrad University. Taking part to the traditional mathematical olympiad of the faculty, he solved the problems for both first year and second year students and, since he did not make this a secret, the other participants did not submit their solutions causing the invalidation of the contest by the jury which therefore did not award the prize. However, he attracted the attention of Solomon Mikhlin who invited him at his home, thus starting their lifelong friendship: and this friendship had a great influence on him, helping him develop his mathematical style more than anyone else. Maz'ya had found the topics of his dissertations by himself, while Mikhlin taught him mathematical ethics and rules of writing, referring and reviewing".

More details on the life of Vladimir Maz'ya, from his birth to the year 1968, can be found in his autobiography .

Maz'ya graduated from Leningrad University in 1960. The same year he gave two talks at Smirnov's seminar: their contents were published as a short report in the Proceedings of the USSR Academy of Sciences and later evolved in his "kandidat nauk" thesis, "Classes of sets and embedding theorems for function spaces", which was defended in 1962. In 1965 he earned the Doktor nauk degree, again from Leningrad University, defending the dissertation "Dirichlet and Neumann problems in Domains with irregular boundaries", when he was only 27. Neither the first nor his second thesis were written under the guidance of an advisor: Vladimir Maz'ya never had a formal scientific adviser, choosing the research problems he worked to by himself.

From 1960 up to 1986, he worked as a "research fellow" at the Research Institute of Mathematics and Mechanics of Leningrad University (RIMM), being promoted from junior to senior research fellow in 1965.

In 1978 he married Tatyana Shaposhnikova, a former doctoral student of Solomon Mikhlin, and they have a son, Michael: In 1990, they left the URSS for Sweden, where Prof. Maz'ya obtained the Swedish citizenship and started to work at Linköping University.

Currently, he is honorary Senior Fellow of Liverpool University and Professor Emeritus at Linköping University: he is also member of the editorial board of several mathematical journals.

Honors
In 1962 Maz'ya was awarded the "Young Mathematician" prize by the Leningrad Mathematical Society, for his results on Sobolev spaces: he was the first winner of the prize. In 1990 he was awarded an honorary doctorate from Rostock University. In 1999, Maz'ya received the Humboldt Prize. He was elected member of the Royal Society of Edinburgh in 2000, and of the Swedish Academy of Science in 2002. In March 2003, he, jointly with Tatyana Shaposhnikova, was awarded the Verdaguer Prize by the French Academy of Sciences. On 31 August 2004 he was awarded the Celsius Gold Medal, the Royal Society of Sciences in Uppsala's top award, "for his outstanding research on partial differential equations and hydrodynamics". He was awarded the Senior Whitehead Prize by the London Mathematical Society on 20 November 2009. In 2012 he was elected fellow of the American Mathematical Society. On 30 October 2013 he was elected foreign member of the Georgian National Academy of Sciences.

Starting from 1993, several conferences have been held to honor him: the first one, held in that year at the University of Kyoto, was a conference on Sobolev spaces. On the occasion of his 60th birthday in 1998, two international conferences were held in his honor: the one at the University of Rostock was on Sobolev spaces, while the other, at the École Polytechnique in Paris, was on the boundary element method. He was invited speaker at the International Mathematical Congress held in Beijing in 2002: his talk is an exposition on his work on Wiener–type criteria for higher order elliptic equations. Other two conferences were held on the occasion of his 70th birthday: "Analysis, PDEs and Applications on the occasion of the 70th birthday of Vladimir Maz'ya" was held in Rome, while the "Nordic – Russian Symposium in honour of Vladimir Maz'ya on the occasion of his 70th birthday" was held in Stockholm. On the same occasion, also a volume of the Proceedings of Symposia in Pure Mathematics was dedicated to him. On the occasion of his 80th birthday, a "Workshop on Sobolev Spaces and Partial Differential Equations" was held on 17–18 May 2018 was held at the Accademia Nazionale dei Lincei to honor him. On the 26–31 May 2019, the international conference "Harmonic Analysis and PDE" was held in his honor at the Holon Institute of Technology.

Work

Research activity

Maz'ya authored/coauthored more than 500 publications, including 20 research monographs. Several survey articles describing his work can be found in the book , and also the paper by Dorina and Marius Mitrea (2008) describes extensively his research achievements, so these references are the main ones in this section: in particular, the classification of the research work of Vladimir Maz'ya is the one proposed by the authors of these two references.

Theory of boundary value problems in nonsmooth domains
In one of his early papers,  considers the Dirichlet problem for the following linear elliptic equation:

where 
 is a bounded region in the –dimensional euclidean space
He proves the following a priori estimate

Selected works

Papers

Books
.
 (also available with ).
. 
 (also available as ).
.
.
. There are also two revised and expanded editions: the French translation , and the (further revised and expanded) Russian translation .
.
.
.
.
.
.
.
.
.
.
.
.
.
 (also published with ).

See also
Function space
Multiplication operator
Partial differential equation
Potential theory
Sobolev space

Notes

References

Biographical and general references 
. A biographical paper written on the occasion of Maz'ya 65th birthday: a freely accessible version is available here from Prof. Maz'ya website.
. A biographical paper written on the occasion of Maz'ya 70th birthday (a freely accessible English translation is available here from Prof. Maz'ya web site), translated from the (freely accessible) Russian original .
.
.
.
. Another biographical paper written on the occasion of Maz'ya 70th birthday: a freely accessible version is available here from Prof. Maz'ya web site.
. Proceedings of the minisymposium held at the École Polytechnique, Palaiseau, 25–29 May 1998.
.
.
.
. A two–volume continuation of the opus "Mathematics in the USSR during its first forty years 1917–1957", describing the developments of Soviet mathematics during the period 1958–1967. Precisely it is meant as a continuation of the second volume of that work and, as such, is titled "Biobibliography" (evidently an acronym of biography and bibliography). It includes new biographies (when possible, brief and complete) and bibliographies of works published by new Soviet mathematicians during that period, and updates on the work and biographies of scientist included in the former volume, alphabetically ordered with respect to author's surname.
. A list of the winners of the Verdaguer Prize in PDF format, including short motivations for the awarding.
. The membership diploma awarded to Vladimir Maz'ya on the occasion of his election as foreign member of the Georgian National Academy of Sciences.
.
.

. The summary of the kandidat nauk thesis of Aben Khvoles, one of the doctoral students of Vladimir Maz'ya.
. 

 (e–).

.
.
. The "Presentation of prizes and awards" speech given by the Secretary of the Royal Society of Sciences in Uppsala, written in the "yearbook 2004", on the occasion of the awarding of the Society prizes to prof. V. Maz'ya and to other 2004 winners.

Scientific references
.
.
.
.
.
.
.
.
.

Publications and conferences and dedicated to Vladimir Maz'ya
.
 (e–).

. Proceedings of the minisymposium held at the École Polytechnique, Palaiseau, 25–29 May 1998.
.
.
.
.
.
.

External links

Professor's Maz'ya's home page

1937 births
Living people
Mathematicians from Saint Petersburg
Russian Jews
Soviet emigrants to Sweden
Soviet mathematicians
Swedish people of Russian-Jewish descent
20th-century Russian mathematicians
21st-century Russian mathematicians
Academics of the University of Liverpool
Fellows of the Royal Society of Edinburgh
Fellows of the American Mathematical Society
Academic staff of Linköping University
Mathematical analysts
Members of the Royal Swedish Academy of Sciences
PDE theorists